St Margaret's Uniting Church is a Uniting church in , Australian Capital Territory, Australia.

The soaring spire of the church building it shares with Holy Cross Anglican congregation is a major landmark in North Canberra, at the intersection of the four suburbs of Watson, Dickson, Downer and Hackett.

History
St. Margaret's Uniting Church, together with Holy Cross Anglican Church, are the only remaining congregations from different denominations in the Australian Capital Territory to continue to share a church, hall and grounds, and on occasions ministers and even services.

The Church was founded in 1964 as a shared congregation of the Presbyterian and Methodist churches in the then newly built North Canberra suburbs of Watson, Dickson, Downer and Hackett.  In doing so it predated by over a decade the family of churches it now belongs to, the Uniting Church in Australia, which was formed in 1977 when the Congregational, Methodist and Presbyterian churches came together.

Services were initially held in school rooms until the completion and official dedication of the church building on 16 December 1967.

It faces the Australian Catholic University's Canberra Campus (Signadou), built in 1963 as the Dominican Sisters' Teacher Training College, across Antill Street.

The church is home to Meg's Toybox, the major toy library for North Canberra, and the Stepping Stones for Life disability support organisation.

Tradition
Worship at St Margaret's is in the liberal Protestant tradition of the Uniting Church in Australia.

References

External links
Official Church website

Uniting churches in Australia
Churches in the Australian Capital Territory
1964 establishments in Australia
Churches completed in 1964